Union Church of Pocantico Hills is a historic church in Pocantico Hills, New York. The church was built by John D. Rockefeller Jr. in 1921, as part of his plans to develop the town of Pocantico Hills, which was below his estate Kykuit. Upon the death of Rockefeller's wife Abby Aldrich Rockefeller in 1948, their son Nelson Rockefeller commissioned Henri Matisse to design the church's rose window in honor of her memory shortly before the artist's own death in 1954. When John D. Rockefeller Jr. died in 1960, his children commissioned artist Marc Chagall to design a Good Samaritan window in his honor.  It is a one-story neo-Gothic style building with fieldstone foundation and walls and a slate covered, highly pitched gable roof.  In 1930–1931, a parish hall was added to the east end of the church.

On May 6, 2006, the church was listed in the National Register of Historic Places.

Organ
David Rockefeller, members of the Rockefeller family, and members of the church commissioned organbuilder Sebastian M. Glück to design and build the Laurance Spelman Rockefeller Memorial Pipe Organ in 2006. It is based  upon the organs of fin-de-siècle Paris, notably influenced by the work of Aristide Cavaillé-Coll, and it complements the family's taste in the art of that era. It is used for public recitals as well as for church services.

See also
National Register of Historic Places listings in northern Westchester County, New York

References

External links

 

Churches on the National Register of Historic Places in New York (state)
National Register of Historic Places in Westchester County, New York
Gothic Revival church buildings in New York (state)
Churches completed in 1921
Churches in Westchester County, New York
Pocantico Hills, New York
Henri Matisse